Iwasaki's snail-eater (Pareas iwasakii) is a species of snake in the family Pareidae. The species is endemic to the Yaeyama Islands in the southern Ryukyu Islands, Japan.

Etymology
The specific name, iwasakii, is in honor of Japanese meteorologist Takuji Iwasaki.

Ecology

Pareas iwasakii is a snail-eating specialist; even newly hatched individuals feed on snails. It has asymmetric jaws, with more teeth on the right (about 25 teeth compared to 15 teeth on the left) which facilitates feeding on snails with dextral (clockwise coiled) shells. A consequence of this asymmetry is that Pareas iwasakii is much less adept at preying on sinistral (counterclockwise coiled) snails.  It systematically directs its attack on snails from the right in order to insert its lower jaw into the shell opening. 

The selection pressure of this predator on snails of the genus Satsuma (en) has led to a significant increase in the proportion of snails with left-facing shells, known as levogyres, compared to snails with right-facing shells, known as dextrogyres, because the two forms have difficulty mating with each other. This proportion is a local originality, the levorotatory form being very rare on a worldwide scale.

Taxonomy
Originally described as Amblycephalus formosensis iwasakii by Moichirō Maki, it is currently placed in the genus Pareas.

References

Further reading
 .

Pareas
Endemic reptiles of Japan
Reptiles described in 1937
Taxonomy articles created by Polbot